Lamagistère is a commune in the Tarn-et-Garonne department in the Occitanie region in southern France. Inhabitants of the district are known as
les Magistériens.

Geography
The district is located between the larger towns of Agen and Castelsarrasin. The nearest villages are 
Golfech, Donzac, Clermont-Soubiran, Saint-Urcisse and Saint-Sixte. The Barguelonne forms all of the commune's south-eastern border, then flows into the Garonne, which forms its southern and south-western borders. The commune, which is approximately 9 km2, is composed of a small village and surrounding territory.

The Route nationale N113 (national trunk road), used to run through the middle of the village but was later diverted 
around the town. In 2006, the French government downgraded some national trunk roads to departmental status roads. The N113
was one such road which was downgraded and now the diverted road is signed as the D813. However the historical designation can still be seen in a street sign in the middle of the village.

In fact the middle of the village is also a cross roads with the D30, which commences as a bridge over the Garonne River.

Lamagistère station, on the Bordeaux-Toulouse line, is located in the middle of the town. The village has a public library and a school but lacks, in 2012, a cinema or museum.

History 
During the second world war the district was at the heart of a Franco-American sabotage operation. 
On the night of 15 to 16 August 1944, a section of the train line running between Bordeaux and Toulouse,
which was defended by a garrison of German soldiers, was attacked by a combined force of American commandos, French partisans
from Lot and a company of the Armée Secrète of 
Tarn-et-Garonne.

Demographics 
The following table shows the recorded population of the commune according to INSEE.

Political Administration
The following table shows the names of the elected mayors of the commune in recent times and their period of tenure in the post.

See also 
Communes of the Tarn-et-Garonne department

References

Communes of Tarn-et-Garonne